Michael Antonio Cimino (February 3, 1939 – July 2, 2016) was an American filmmaker. One of the "New Hollywood" directors, Cimino achieved fame with The Deer Hunter (1978), which won five Academy Awards, including Best Picture and Best Director.

Born in New York City, Cimino began his career filming commercials and moved to Los Angeles to take up screenwriting in 1971. After co-writing the scripts of Silent Running (1972) and Magnum Force (1973), he wrote the preliminary script for Thunderbolt and Lightfoot (1974), which became his directorial debut, and one of the highest-grossing films of its year.

The critical accolades for co-writing, directing, and producing The Deer Hunter in 1978 led to Cimino receiving creative control for Heaven's Gate (1980). The film became a critical failure and a legendary box-office bomb, which lost production studio United Artists an estimated $37 million. Its failure was widely credited with Hollywood studios shifting focus from director-driven films towards high-concept, crowd-pleasing blockbusters. In recent decades, Heaven's Gate has been dramatically reappraised, being named by BBC Culture as one of the greatest American films of all-time, and by critic Robin Wood as "among the supreme achievements of the Hollywood cinema." His final feature film was The Sunchaser, released in 1996. Up until his death, he continued to work on films that were ultimately never made.

Early life 
Cimino was born in New York City on February 3, 1939. Cimino gave various dates for his birth, but his real birthdate was most likely February 3, 1939. In reference to Cimino's interview with Leticia Kent on December 10, 1978, Bach said, "Cimino wasn't thirty-five but a few months shy of forty." A third-generation Italian-American, Cimino and his brothers grew up in suburban Westbury, New York on Long Island. He was regarded as a prodigy at the private schools to which his parents sent him, but rebelled as an adolescent by consorting with delinquents, getting into fights, and coming home drunk. Of this time, Cimino described himself as "always hanging around with kids my parents didn't approve of. Those guys were so alive. When I was fifteen I spent three weeks driving all over Brooklyn with a guy who was following his girlfriend. He was convinced she was cheating on him, and he had a gun, he was going to kill her. There was such passion and intensity about their lives. When the rich kids got together, the most we ever did was cross against a red light."

His father was a music publisher. Cimino says his father was responsible for marching bands and organs playing pop music at football games.
"When my father found out I went into the movie business, he didn't talk to me for a year," Cimino said. "He was very tall and thin ... His weight never changed his whole life and he didn't have a gray hair on his head. He was a bit like a Vanderbilt or a Whitney, one of those guys. He was the life of the party, women loved him, a real womanizer. He smoked like a fiend. He loved his martinis. He died really young. He was away a lot, but he was fun. I was just a tiny kid."His mother was a costume designer. After he made The Deer Hunter, she said that she knew he had become famous because his name was in The New York Times crossword puzzle.

Cimino graduated from Westbury High School in 1956. He entered Michigan State University in East Lansing, Michigan. At Michigan State, Cimino majored in graphic arts, was a member of a weightlifting club, and participated in a group to welcome incoming students. He graduated in 1959 with honors and won the Harry Suffrin Advertising Award. He was described in the 1959 Red Cedar Log yearbook as having tastes that included blondes, Thelonious Monk, Chico Hamilton, Mort Sahl, Ludwig Mies van der Rohe, Frank Lloyd Wright, and "drinking, preferably vodka."

In Cimino's final year at Michigan State, he became art director, and later managing editor, of the school's humor magazine Spartan. Steven Bach wrote of Cimino's early magazine work: 
"It is here that one can see what are perhaps the first public manifestations of the Cimino visual sensibility, and they are impressive. He thoroughly restyled the Spartan's derivative Punch look, designing a number of its strikingly handsome covers himself. The Cimino-designed covers are bold and strong, with a sure sense of space and design. They compare favorably to professional work honored in, say, any of the Modern Publicity annuals of the late fifties and are far better than the routine work turned out on Madison Avenue. The impact and quality of his work no doubt contributed to his winning the Harry Suffrin Advertising Award at MSU and perhaps to his acceptance at Yale."

At Yale, Cimino continued to study painting as well as architecture and art history and became involved in school dramatics. In 1962, while still at Yale, he enlisted in the U.S. Army Reserve. He trained for five months at Fort Dix, New Jersey and had a month of medical training at Fort Sam Houston, Texas. Cimino graduated from Yale, receiving his Bachelor of Fine Arts in 1961 and his Master of Fine Arts in 1963, both in painting.

Career

1960s

After graduating from Yale, Cimino moved to Manhattan to work in Madison Avenue advertising and became a star director of television commercials. He shot ads for L'eggs hosiery, Kool cigarettes, Eastman Kodak, United Airlines, and Pepsi, among others. "I met some people who were doing fashion stuffcommercials and stills. And there were all these incredibly beautiful girls," Cimino said. "And then, zoomthe next thing I know, overnight, I was directing commercials." For example, Cimino directed the 1967 United Airlines commercial "Take Me Along," a musical extravaganza in which a group of ladies sing "Take Me Along" (adapted from a short-lived Broadway musical) to a group of men, presumably their husbands, to take them on a flight.

The commercial is filled with the dynamic visuals, American symbolism and elaborate set design that became Cimino's trademark. "The clients of the agencies liked Cimino," remarked Charles Okun, his production manager from 1964 to 1978. "His visuals were fabulous, but the amount of time it took was just astronomical. Because he was so meticulous and took so long. Nothing was easy with Michael." Through his commercial work, Cimino met Joann Carelli, then a commercial director representative. They began a 30-year on-again-off-again relationship.

1970s
In 1971, Cimino moved to Los Angeles to start a career as a screenwriter. According to Cimino, it was Carelli that got him into screenwriting: "[Joann] actually talked me into it. I'd never really written anything ever before. I still don't regard myself as a writer. I've probably written thirteen to fourteen screenplays by [1978] and I still don't think of myself that way. Yet, that's how I make a living." Cimino added, "I started writing screenplays principally because I didn't have the money to buy books or to option properties. At that time you only had a chance to direct if you owned a screenplay which some star wanted to do, and that's precisely what happened with Thunderbolt and Lightfoot."

Cimino gained representation from Stan Kamen of William Morris Agency. The spec script Thunderbolt and Lightfoot was shown to Clint Eastwood, who bought it for his production company, Malpaso and allowed Cimino a chance to direct the film. Cimino co-wrote two scripts (the science fiction film Silent Running and Eastwood's second Dirty Harry film, Magnum Force) before moving to directing. Cimino's work on Thunderbolt and Lightfoot impressed Eastwood enough to ask him to work on the script for Magnum Force before Thunderbolt and Lightfoot began production.

Cimino moved up to directing on the feature Thunderbolt and Lightfoot. The film stars Clint Eastwood as a Korean War veteran named "Thunderbolt" who takes a young drifter named "Lightfoot", played by Jeff Bridges, under his wing. When Thunderbolt's old partners try to find him, he and Lightfoot make a pact with them to pull one last big heist. Eastwood was originally slated to direct it himself, but Cimino impressed Eastwood enough to change his mind. The film became a solid box office success at the time, making $25,000,000 at the box office with a budget of $4,000,000 and earned Bridges an Academy Award nomination for Best Supporting Actor.

Cimino later said that if it were not for Clint Eastwood, he would not have been in the movies: "I owe everything to Clint."

With the success of Thunderbolt and Lightfoot, Cimino said that he "got a lot of offers, but decided to take a gamble. I would only get involved with projects I really wanted to do." He rejected several offers before pitching an ambitious Vietnam War film to EMI executives in November 1976. To Cimino's surprise, EMI accepted the film. Cimino went on to co-write, co-produce, and direct The Deer Hunter. The film stars Robert De Niro, Christopher Walken, and John Savage as three buddies in a Pennsylvania steel mill town who fight in the Vietnam War and rebuild their lives in the aftermath. The film went over-schedule and over-budget, but it became a massive critical and commercial success, and won five Oscars, including Best Director and Best Picture for Cimino.

1980s
On the basis of his previous success, Cimino was given free rein by United Artists for his next film, Heaven's Gate. The film came in several times over budget. After its release, it proved to be a financial disaster that nearly bankrupted the studio. Heaven's Gate became the lightning rod for the industry perception of the loosely controlled situation in Hollywood at that time. The film's failure marked the end of the New Hollywood era. Transamerica Corporation sold United Artists, having lost confidence in the company and its management.

Heaven's Gate was such a devastating critical and commercial bomb that public perception of Cimino's work was tainted in its wake; the majority of his subsequent films achieved neither popular nor critical success. Many critics who had originally praised The Deer Hunter became far more reserved about the picture and Cimino after Heaven's Gate. The story of the making of the movie, and UA's subsequent downfall, was documented in Steven Bach's book Final Cut. Cimino's film was somewhat rehabilitated by an unlikely source: the Z Channel, a cable pay TV channel that at its peak in the mid-1980s served 100,000 of Los Angeles's most influential film professionals. After the unsuccessful release of the re-edited and shortened Heaven's Gate, Jerry Harvey, the channel's programmer, decided to play Cimino's original 219-minute cut on Christmas Eve 1982. The reassembled movie received admiring reviews.  The full-length, director-approved version was released on LaserDisc by MGM/UA and later reissued on DVD and Blu-ray by the Criterion Collection.

Cimino directed a 1985 crime drama, Year of the Dragon, which he and Oliver Stone adapted from Robert Daley's novel. Year of the Dragon was nominated for five Razzie awards, including Worst Director and Worst Screenplay. The film was sharply criticized for what many saw as offensively stereotypical depictions of Chinese Americans. 
Cimino directed The Sicilian from a Mario Puzo novel in 1987. The film bombed at the box office, costing an estimated $16 million, grossing $5 million domestically.

1990s
In 1990, Cimino directed a remake of the film The Desperate Hours starring Anthony Hopkins and Mickey Rourke. The film was another box-office disappointment, grossing less than $3 million. According to some official sources, Michael Cimino's original cut of Desperate Hours was mutilated by the film's producers, resulting in a very badly edited film filled with plot holes. The only known proof of any deleted scenes are some stills which seemingly show a few of them.

His last feature-length film was 1996's The Sunchaser with Woody Harrelson and Jon Seda. While nominated for the Palme d'Or at that year's Cannes Film Festival, the film was released straight to video.

2000s
In 2001, Cimino published his first novel, Big Jane. Later that year, the French Minister of Culture decorated him Chevalier des Arts et des Lettres and the Prix Littéraire Deauville 2001, an award that previously went to Norman Mailer and Gore Vidal. "Oh, I'm the happiest, I think, I've ever been!" he said in response. Cimino also wrote a book called Conversations en miroir with Francesca Pollock in 2003.

In 2007, Cimino returned to directing briefly to contribute a 3-minute short segment for the anthology film To Each His Own Cinema. The filmmakers were invited to express "their state of mind of the moment as inspired by the motion picture theatre".

2010s
Throughout the 2010s Cimino continued to write screenplays, struggling to get any of them financed.

In 2012, Cimino attended the premiere of a new edit of Heaven's Gate at the Venice Film Festival, which was met with a standing ovation. The film was re-assessed by film critics, and re-edited versions were met with critical acclaim.

In 2015, Cimino received the Locarno Film Festival's Leopard of Honour on the Piazza Grande.

Death and legacy
Cimino died July 2, 2016, at age 77, at his home in Beverly Hills, California. No cause of death has been disclosed to the public.  Since his death, many directors, actors, and other public figures paid tribute to him, including Edgar Wright, William Friedkin, Paul Rust, Christopher McQuarrie, Kelly Lynch, Jason Reitman, Mark Romanek and Jay Baruchel. Film critic F. X. Feeney (a close friend of Cimino's) wrote:
"A few weeks before his death, Michael consulted a physician about a mild respiratory complaint but otherwise suffered no signs of ill health. When I last had lunch with him on June 19th, he was full of energy and plans. Nevertheless, because he was an intuitive man, I feel certain looking back that he had an inkling his life was drawing to a close. He took deliberate care to mend fences with as many people as he could in the last year of his life, and with me that last day he was more reflective than I’d ever known him to be about his early life. He was full of amused memories centered on his dad’s fierce perfectionism. Friends and loved ones found him impossible to reach after the 28th of June, and – when the police entered his house after several days – the officer who found him tucked in his bed described him as “peacefully deceased.” His heart had apparently stopped without trauma, in sleep. There was no funeral or public memorial thereafter, and he needs none. His monuments are onscreen."

His work has been lauded by such filmmakers as Stanley Kubrick, Agnès Varda, David Gordon Green, James Gray and Quentin Tarantino. Oliver Stone, a long time collaborator of Cimino's, said of him: "I have to admit I liked working with Michael Cimino, and I learned a lot from him."

Unreleased projects
From the beginning of his film career, Cimino was attached to many projects that either fell apart in pre-production or were jettisoned due to his reputation following Heaven's Gate. Steven Bach wrote that despite setbacks in Cimino's career, "he may yet deliver a film that will make his career larger than the cautionary tale it often seems to be or, conversely, the story of genius thwarted by the system that is still popular in certain circles." Film historian David Thomson added to this sentiment: "The flimsy nastiness of his last four pictures is no reason to think we have seen the last of Cimino. ... If he ever emerges at full budgetary throttle, his own career should be his subject." In March 2002, Cimino claimed he had written at least 50 scripts overall.

Cimino was announced as the director for The King of Comedy on March 7, 1979, but was later replaced by Martin Scorsese on November 10, due to production being stalled by his focus on the editing process of Heaven's Gate. Cimino believed that Heaven's Gate was going to be successful and announced plans for Conquering Horse, using the Sioux language with English subtitles, on November 14, but the film was never made. He was announced as the director of Live on Tape, to be distributed by CBS Theatrical Films, on December 11, 1981, but the failure of Heaven's Gate resulted in the film's cancellation. He proposed a story about Frank Costello to CBS, but it was rejected.

Cimino was hired to direct Footloose on December 12, 1981, with the stipulation that expenses above the allotted budget would come from Cimino personally. On January 18, 1982, before filming began, Cimino requested $250,000 to rewrite the screenplay and an indefinite delay on when shooting from producer Daniel Melnick, but was fired and replaced by Herbert Ross.

Producer Gary Mehlman gained the film rights to The Yellow Jersey by Ralph Hurne in November 1973. On April 1, 1983, Cimino was hired to direct the film written by Carl Foreman and starring Dustin Hoffman. The film's production cycle began in 1980, but was pushed back multiple times and suffered from Foreman's death in 1984.

Cimino's dream project was an adaptation of Ayn Rand's The Fountainhead. Taking its cue from more than the novel, it was largely modeled on architect Jørn Utzon's troubled building of the Sydney Opera House, as well as the construction of the Empire State Plaza in Albany, New York. He wrote the script in between Thunderbolt and Lightfoot and The Deer Hunter, and hoped to have Clint Eastwood play Howard Roark. Cimino continued to hope to film the script until his death in 2016.

Influences and style

Influences

Cimino showed great admiration for Luchino Visconti, John Ford and Akira Kurosawa, dubbing them "The Holy Trinity of movies." He has also praised the films of Sam Peckinpah. Cimino also named his literary influences as Vladimir Nabokov, Alexander Pushkin, Leo Tolstoy, Gore Vidal, Raymond Carver, Cormac McCarthy, the classics of Islamic literature, Frank Norris and Steven Pinker.

In 1992, Cimino participated in the Sight & Sound film polls. Held every ten years to select the greatest films of all time, directors were asked to select ten films of their choice. Cimino's choices were:

 The Leopard (Italy, 1963)
 They Were Expendable (USA, 1945)
 Ludwig (Italy/France, 1973)
 The Searchers (USA, 1956)
 La Strada (Italy, 1954)
 Children of Paradise (France, 1945)
 My Darling Clementine (USA, 1946)
 La Dolce Vita (Italy, 1960)
 Rocco and His Brothers (Italy, 1960)
 Seven Samurai (Japan, 1954)

Themes and style
Cimino's films are often marked by their controversial subject matter and striking visual style. Elements of Cimino's visual sensibility include shooting in Widescreen (in a 2.35:1 aspect ratio), painterly compositions, jittery tracking shots and wide vista establishing shots that emphasize the Earth's landscape and nature. Cimino's films are also slowly paced, focusing less on story and more on characters, allowing the viewer to observe their nuances and the setting. The subject matter in Cimino's films frequently focuses on aspects of U.S. history and culture, notably disillusionment over the American Dream. Other trademarks include love triangles between central characters, sudden bursts of violence in seemingly tranquil or naturalistic settings and the casting of non-professional actors in supporting roles.

Frequent collaborators
Cimino worked with Mickey Rourke on several films, Heaven's Gate, Year of the Dragon and Desperate Hours, as well as a planned adaptation of William Kennedy's novel Legs with Rourke playing gangster Legs Diamond. Cimino also did the pre-production work for The Pope of Greenwich Village.

Christopher Walken also worked with Cimino on many projects with The Deer Hunter and Heaven's Gate being the only ones that were ever made. Later, in the 2010s, Walken was attached to star in Cream Rises with Taylor Swift. Cimino also did uncredited contributions for the film adaptation of The Dogs of War which Walken starred in.

Cimino rewrote John Milius's screenplay for Magnum Force as a favor to Clint Eastwood. A year later, Cimino directed him in Thunderbolt and Lightfoot. After that, in the mid-70s, Cimino wanted him to play Howard Rourk in his adaptation of Ayn Rand's The Fountainhead. Eastwood turned it down but enlisted Cimino to assist Philip Kaufman in rewriting the screenplay for The Outlaw Josey Wales, although he remains uncredited for his work. Cimino was also set to direct Eastwood in his adaptation of Frederick Forsyth's The Dogs of War but dropped out to work on Heaven's Gate. The film was ultimately made without Eastwood. It was later reported in the early '90s that Cimino was adapting the novel Paradise Junction with Eastwood attached to star. It was unclear if he planned to direct it.

Jeff Bridges co-starred in Thunderbolt and Lightfoot alongside Clint Eastwood and as a supporting character in Heaven's Gate. Bridges was also briefly considered for the role of Stanley White in Year of the Dragon.

In the mid-70s, Cimino and James Toback wrote a biopic about gangster Frank Costello. Later, after working with Cimino on The Deer Hunter, Robert De Niro signed on for the Costello role. The film was never made.

Public image
After Cimino's success with The Deer Hunter, he was considered a "second coming" among critics. In 1985, author Michael Bliss described Michael Cimino as a unique American filmmaker after only three films: "Cimino occupies an important position in today's cinema ... a man whose cinematic obsession it is to extract, represent, and investigate those essential elements in the American psyche ..." Frequent collaborator Mickey Rourke has often praised Cimino for his creativity and dedication to work. On Heaven's Gate, Rourke has said, "I remember thinking this little guy [Cimino] was so well organized. He had this huge production going on all around him yet he could devote his absolute concentration on the smallest of details."

In writing about his experience working on The Sicilian, producer Bruce McNall described Cimino as "one part artistic genius and one part infantile egomaniac." In his book, Blade Runners, Deer Hunters and Blowing the Bloody Doors Off, producer Michael Deeley described his experience with Cimino on Deer Hunter as a "travail", adding "the only flaw I find in my Oscar [for The Deer Hunter] is that Cimino's name is also engraved on it." Deeley criticized Cimino for lack of professional respect and standards: "Cimino was selfish. ... Selfishness, in itself, is not necessarily a flaw in a director, unless it swells into ruthless self-indulgence combined with a total disregard for the terms in which the production has been set." Cinematographer Vilmos Zsigmond reported that Cimino was hard to work with but extremely talented visually.

Movie critics Pauline Kael and John Simon criticized Cimino's abilities as a filmmaker and storyteller. After his failure with Heaven's Gate, some commentators joked and/or suggested that he should give back his Oscars for The Deer Hunter. Pauline Kael in The New Yorker described Cimino's storytelling abilities in her review of Year of the Dragon:

As I see it, Michael Cimino doesn't think in terms of dramatic values: he doesn't know how to develop characters, or how to get any interaction among them. He transposes an art-school student's approach from paintings to movies, and makes visual choices: this is a New York movie, so he wants a lot of blue and harsh light and a realistic surface. He works completely derivatively, from earlier movies, and his only idea of how to dramatize things is to churn up this surface and get it roiling. The whole thing is just material for Cimino the visual artist to impose his personality on. He doesn't actually dramatize himself—it isn't as if he tore his psyche apart and animated the pieces of it (the way a Griffith or a Peckinpah did). He doesn't animate anything.

John Foote questioned whether or not Cimino deserved his Oscars for The Deer Hunter: "It seemed in the spring of 1979, following the Oscar ceremony, there was a sense in the industry that if the Academy could have taken back their votes — which saw The Deer Hunter and director Michael Cimino winning for Best Picture and Best Director — they would have done so."

Peter Biskind described Cimino in relation to The Deer Hunter as "our first, home-grown fascist director, our own Leni Riefenstahl".

Conflicting stories on background
Cimino was known for giving exaggerated, misleading, and conflicting (or simply tongue-in-cheek) stories about himself, his background, and his filmmaking experiences. "When I'm kidding, I'm serious, and when I'm serious, I'm kidding," responded Cimino. "I am not who I am, and I am who I am not."

Age
Cimino gave various dates for his birth, usually shaving a couple of years off to seem younger, including February 3, 1943; November 16, 1943; and February 3, 1952. Many biographies about Cimino, such as the "Michael Cimino" entries in David Thomson's The New Biographical Dictionary of Film and Ephraim Katz's Film Encyclopedia, list his year of birth as 1943. In reference to Cimino's interview with Leticia Kent on December 10, 1978, Steven Bach said, "Cimino wasn't thirty-five but a few months shy of forty."

Education and early career
Cimino claimed he got his start in documentary films following his work in academia and nearly completed a doctorate at Yale. Some of these details are repeated in reviews of Cimino's films and his official summary biographies. Steven Bach refuted those claims in his book Final Cut: "[Cimino] had done no work toward a doctorate and he had become known in New York as a maker not of documentaries but of sophisticated television commercials."

Military service
During the production of The Deer Hunter, Cimino had given co-workers (such as cinematographer Vilmos Zsigmond and associate producer Joann Carelli) the impression that much of the story was autobiographical, somehow related to the director's own experience and based on the lives of men he had known during his service in Vietnam. Just as the film was about to open, Cimino gave an interview to The New York Times in which he claimed that he had been "attached to a Green Beret medical unit" at the time of the Tet Offensive of 1968. When the Times reporter, who had not been able to corroborate this, questioned the studio about it, studio executives panicked and fabricated "evidence" to support the story. Universal Studios president Thom Mount commented at the time, "I know this guy. He was no more a medic in the Green Berets than I'm a rutabaga." Tom Buckley, a veteran Vietnam correspondent for the Times, corroborated that Cimino had done a stint as an Army medic, but that the director had never been attached to the Green Berets. Cimino's active service – six months while a student at Yale in 1962 – had been as a reservist who was never posted to Vietnam. Cimino's publicist reportedly said that the filmmaker intended to sue Buckley, but Cimino never did.

Filmography

As director

As writer

Awards and nominations

Bibliography
Big Jane. Paris: Gallimard, 2001. .
Conversations en miroir. Co-authored with Francesca Pollock. Paris: Gallimard, 2003. .

References

Further reading

Bach, Steven (September 1, 1999). Final Cut: Art, Money, and Ego in the Making of Heaven's Gate, the Film That Sank United Artists (Updated ed.). New York, NY: Newmarket Press. .
Bliss, Michael (1985). Martin Scorsese & Michael Cimino (Hardcover ed.). Metuchen, NJ: Scarecrow Press Inc. .
Heard, Christopher (2006). Mickey Rourke: High and Low. London, England: Plexus Publishing Ltd. .
Carducci, Mark Patrick (writer); Gallagher, John Andrew (editor) (July 1977). "Michael Cimino". Film Directors on Directing (Paperback ed.). Westport, CT: Praeger Publishers. .
Deeley, Michael (April 7, 2009). Blade Runners, Deer Hunters, & Blowing the Bloody Doors Off: My Life in Cult Movies (Hardcover ed.). New York, NY: Pegasus Books LLC. .
Elton, Charles (2022). Cimino: The Deer Hunter, Heaven's Gate, and the Price of a Vision (1st ed.). New York, NY: Abrams. .
Hickenlooper, George (May 1991). "Michael Cimino: A Final Word". Reel Conversations: Candid Interviews with Film's Foremost Directors and Critics (1st ed.). Secaucus, N.J.: Citadel. pp. 76–89. .
Heard, Christopher (2006). Mickey Rourke: High and Low. London, England: Plexus Publishing Ltd. .
Kael, Pauline (1989). "The Great White Hope". Hooked (Hardcover ed.). New York, NY: E.P Dutton. pp. 31–38. .
McGilligan, Patrick (1999). Clint: The Life and Legend. London: Harper Collins. .
McNall, Bruce; D'Antonio, Michael (July 9, 2003). Fun While It Lasted: My Rise and Fall In the Land of Fame and Fortune (1st ed.). New York, NY: Hyperion. .
Powers, John (writer); Rainer, Peter (editor) (1992). "Michael Cimino: Year of the Dragon". Love and Hisses. San Francisco, CA: Mercury House. pp. 310–320. .
Thomson, David (October 26, 2010). The New Biographical Dictionary of Film: Fifth Edition, Completely Updated and Expanded (Hardcover ed.). Knopf. .
Thoret, Jean-Baptiste. Le Cinéma américain des années 1970, Éditions de l'Étoile/Cahiers du cinéma, 2006. 
Thoret, Jean-Baptiste. En route avec Michael Cimino, large profile and interview published in Cahiers du Cinéma, October 2011.
Adair, Gilbert (1981). Hollywood's Vietnam (1989 revised ed.). London: Proteus. 
Marchetti, Gina (1991). "Ethnicity, the Cinema and Cultural Studies." Unspeakable Images: Ethnicity and the American Cinema. Ed. Lester D. Friedman. Urbana: University of Illinois Press. 
Marchetti, Gina (1993). "Conclusion: The Postmodern Spectacle of Race and Romance in 'Year of the Dragon.'" Romance and the "Yellow Peril": Race, Sex, and Discursive Strategies in Hollywood Fiction. Berkeley: University of California Press. 
McGee, Patrick (2007). "The Multitude at Heaven's Gate". From Shane to Kill Bill. Malden: Blackwell Publishing. 
Wood, Robin (1986). "From Buddies to Lovers" + "Two Films by Michael Cimino". Hollywood from Vietnam to Reagan and Beyond. New York. 
Woolland, Brian (1995). "Class Frontiers: The View through Heaven's Gate." The Book of Westerns. Ed. Ian Cameron and Douglas Pye. New York: Continuum.

External links
 
 
 MichaelCimino.Fr French fan-created website

1939 births
2016 deaths
Age controversies
American people of Italian descent
Best Directing Academy Award winners
Combat medics
Directors Guild of America Award winners
Film directors from New York City
People from Old Westbury, New York
Producers who won the Best Picture Academy Award
United States Army soldiers
Yale School of Art alumni
United States Army reservists